Astathes fasciata is a species of beetle in the family Cerambycidae. It was described by Gahan in 1901. It is known from the Philippines.

References

F
Beetles described in 1901